On December 26, 2020, three people were killed and three others injured in a mass shooting at Don Carter Lanes, a bowling alley in Rockford, Illinois, U.S. A sole suspect was arrested after the shooting and later identified as Duke Webb, who at the time was an active-duty Special Forces soldier.

Shooting 
At the time of the shooting, most of the bowling alley was closed to the public due to COVID-19 safety precautions, excluding the second-floor bar and carryout service area. There were about 20 to 25 people inside the building at the time. The gunman opened fire with two Glock pistols, a .40-caliber and a .380-caliber, around the bowling alley shortly before 6:55 pm before moving inside the building, with officers arriving shortly after.

Officers were able to locate Webb shortly after arriving at the bowling alley and take him into custody, although he had taken time to attempt to conceal his identity and weapons. An eyewitness at the bowling alley helped identify Webb to responding officers, and after his arrest Webb told officers where he had hid the .40-caliber Glock and .380-caliber Glock 42 that he used in the shootings.

Victims 
The three victims killed in the shooting were all men aged 65, 69, and 73. The wounded were a 14-year-old boy who was shot in the face, a 16-year-old girl shot in the shoulder, and a 69-year-old man shot multiple times.
In total, there were three killed, all men in their late sixties and early seventies. Their identities were released on December 28:

 Thomas Furseth, age 65
 Jerome Woodfork, age 69
 Dennis Steinhoff, age 73

The wounded were 14-year-old Printess Wynn who was shot in the face, his 16-year-old friend Aaliyha Estrada who was shot in the shoulder, and 62-year-old Tyrone Lewis who was shot five times.

Suspect 

Webb was arrested shortly after the shooting and was held without bond in the Winnebago County Jail. He was charged with three counts of first-degree murder and three counts of attempted first-degree murder. At the time of the shooting he was a Special Forces Assistant Operations and Intelligence Sergent first class as an engineer and parachute rigger, assigned to the 3rd Battalion, 7th Special Forces Group based in Eglin Air Force Base near Pensacola, Florida and had joined the US Army in 2008. He had served four tours of duty in Afghanistan; from August to December 2009, October 2013 to April 2014, October 2014 to April 2015 and from January 2020 to July 2020. In his service Webb had been awarded the Bronze Star, the Army Commendation Medal, and the Army Achievement Medal, along with multiple other awards.

In his first court appearance via video on December 28, Webb's attorneys acknowledged that he would be undergoing mental health evaluations and raised claims that Webb potentially suffers from PTSD. Webb reportedly also has issues with memory loss.

Aftermath 
The Commander of the 7th Special Forces Group, Colonel John W. Sannes, issued a statement of condolences about the shooting and its victims, and stated that the Army and his department were coordinating with the Rockford Police Department. Sannes' comments were echoed by Major Gen. John Brennan, the commander of 1st Special Forces Command, in which he called the actions of Webb "abhorrent".

A GoFundMe was created shortly after the shooting to help the families of the victims, and the Illinois Bank & Trust and a local business, established a victims relief fund to help provide direct financial relief to victims and their families.

References 

2020 in Illinois
2020 mass shootings in the United States
2020s crimes in Illinois
Attacks on buildings and structures in 2020
Attacks on buildings and structures in the United States
December 2020 crimes in the United States
Mass shootings in the United States
Mass shootings in Illinois
Rockford, Illinois
2020 active shooter incidents in the United States